The Colombia international is an open international badminton tournament in Colombia.  The tournament has been a Future Series level since 2009, then in 2014 categorized as International Series level. This tournament is one of the young international tournament in BWF.

Previous Winners

References 

Badminton tournaments
Sports competitions in Colombia
Badminton in Colombia
2009 establishments in Colombia